Céline Carzo is a French singer. She represented Luxembourg in the Eurovision Song Contest 1990.

A native of Nice, Céline Carzo was 17 years old when she performed "Quand je te rêve" ("When I Dream of You") as her entry in the Contest, which was held in the Croatian capital, Zagreb, then part of Yugoslavia.

Carzo was born in 1972 and at the age of 17 entered the Nice Conservatoire. Her performance of "Quand je te rêve" was heard by Orlando, the brother of singer Dalida, who suggested the song as Luxembourg's Eurovision entry for 1990.

References

External links 
 

French women singers
People from Nice
Living people
Eurovision Song Contest entrants for Luxembourg
Eurovision Song Contest entrants of 1990
Year of birth missing (living people)